The Reformed Evangelical Church of Indonesia, abbreviated GRII, also Indonesian Reformed Evangelical Church, is a Reformed Christian church that is headquartered in Jakarta, Indonesia. It was founded by Stephen Tong, a Chinese-born Indonesian evangelist.

History
Andrew Gih of the Evangelize China Fellowship established the Southeast Bible Seminary in Malang, East Java in 1952, and Tong graduated from it in 1961, establishing the church in 1989 following many years of preaching and evangelism.

Timeline 
In 1974 Tong conducts seminars in Surabaya and 2 years later become a guest lecturer in China Evangelical Seminary.
Later in 1984 turned to Jakarta to uphold the Spirit of Reformed and Evangelical theology.  Two years later in 1986 he was the co-founder of Reformed Evangelical School of Theology in Jakarta and Surabaya, and library and printing station that provides Christian Books.
In 1989 Tong founded the Institute of Reformed Evangelical Indonesia the LRII, which become Gereja Reformed Injili Indonesia.
1991 - 2007 Tong serves as Rector in the Reformed Evangelical Divinity School in indonesia
In 1996 Stephen Tong become the chairman of the church Synod and in 1998 heserved as a Rector in The Reformed Institute in Indonesia
In 2008 Tong received an honorary degree from Westminster Theological Seminary in Philadelphia, PA.

Stephen Tong founded the Reformed Evangelical Church of Indonesia in 1989 to establish a Reformed theology-based church and congregations who are committed to evangelism.

The GRII is headquartered in the Reformed Millennium Center, in Sawah Besar, Jakarta, where it has its largest church, the Messiah Cathedral. It has congregations in other major cities in Indonesia, as well as in Singapore, Kuala Lumpur, Australia, China, Taiwan, Germany and the USA.

Beliefs
The church subscribes to the Reformed confessions generally accepted by Reformed churches, but it has its own unique confession of faith.
Some churches use the Westminster Confession of Faith and the Heidelberg Catechism.

Church organization
Stephen Tong is currently the Head of Synod of the Reformed Evangelical Church of Indonesia.

The Reformed Evangelical Church of Indonesia and its affiliated institutions have female evangelists, lecturers, and church council members. They are allowed to preach and assume authoritative roles, although they are not ordained.
 Benyamin Intan, pastor, is a member of the board of directors for the World Reformed Fellowship.
FIRES (Fellowship of Indonesian Reformed Evangelical Students) lead by Preacher Edward Oei.
STEMI (Stephen Tong Evangelistic Ministries International) lead by Preacher Stephen Tong as movement to reach international community in Christ.

Recent issues 
Stephen Tong has preached the Gospel to 1,5 million Indonesians in 2012. According to the International Evangelism Fellowship's adaptation of the press release by the Indonesian Evangelical Reformed Church until November 2012 the Reformed Evangelical Church's sermons have reached 1,5 millions.
700 preaching assemblies that was led by Stephen Tong were held. In October 200,000 people were able to hear the Gospel. The church reaped great evangelisation work in 2012.

Indonesia is populated by about 250 million people, in which the majority are Muslims. Thus, evangelisation there is a long process. As Pastor Tong noted, if the GRII preaches to 1 million people per year it would take 218 years for all Indonesians to hear the Gospel.
Therefore, he urged the church to not be proud of its accomplishments, because there is great distance towards the evangelisation of the entire country.

In a four-days evangelistic outreach in December 2012 Tong preached in the Messiah Cathedral in Jakarta to 30,000 attenders.

On December 28, 2019, at the National Reformed Evangelical Convention (NREC), an annually held convention in Indonesia, Pastor Tong brought up an issue that the church was currently experiencing: a crisis of male servants to serve as Sunday school teachers and a vacant of fatherly authority in children's life because Sunday school teachers are predominantly women. He called for the young generation, especially men, to surrender themselves as servants of God to serve as Sunday school teachers in their respective churches.

Worship center

In 2008, a new building for the Reformed Evangelical Church in Jakarta called Reformed Millennium Center of Indonesia (RMCI), which includes The Messiah Cathedral (a 4800-seat auditorium), was finished. It took 16 years to persuade the Indonesian government to issue a permit to build the church. The church building was personally designed by Tong himself. In the Calvin auditorium, concerts were held in the opening of the Cathedral in 2008. The building also includes a theological seminary, STT Reformed Injili Internasional, founded by the Synod of Reformed Evangelical Church of Indonesia in cooperation with Reformed Institute for Christianity and the 21st Century (Stephen Tong Evangelistic Ministries International). The seminary has a strong relation with Westminster Theological Seminary.

Other centers
There are churches in Jakarta, Bandung, Yogyakarta, Semarang, Surabaya, Malang, Denpasar, Palembang, Medan, Batam, Samarinda, Singapore, Balikpapan, Kuala Lumpur, Melbourne, Sydney, Perth, Taipei, Taichung, Guangzhou, Beijing, Shanghai, Xiamen, Hong Kong, Berlin, Hamburg, München, Toronto, Boston, Los Angeles, and Tokyo. The church has approximately 56 congregations.

International organisations
Member of the World Reformed Fellowship.

Notable churches
INDONESIA

JAKARTA
GRII Pusat
GRII Bintaro
GRII Karawaci
GRII Pondok Indah
GRII Kelapa Gading
GRII Buaran
GRII Cikarang
GRII Kebon Jeruk
GRII BSD
GRII Kuningan
GRII Depok
GRII Cibubur
GRII Bogor
GRII Pantai Indah Kapuk
MRII Gading Serpong
PRII Harapan Indah
JAWA & BALI
GRII Andhika Surabaya
GRII Ngagel Surabaya
GRII Malang
GRII Bandung
GRII Semarang
GRII Denpasar
GRII Kertajaya
GRII Citra Raya
GRII Sidoarjo
GRII Graha Famili
MRII Yokyakarta
MRII Solo
PRII Kediri
SUMATERA
GRII Medan
GRII Palembang
GRII Batam
MRII Lampung
SULAWESI & MALUKU
MRII Manado
MRII Makasar
PRII Ternate
KALIMANTAN
GRII Samarinda
MRII Balikpapan
MRII Pontianak
PRII Banjarmasin
NUSA TENGGARA TIMUR
PRII Kupang

ASIA
GRII Singapore
MRII Singapore
MRII Kuala Lumpur
MRII KL-Klang Valley
MRII Kuching
GRII Taipei
GRII Guangzhou
GRII Shanghai
MRII Taichung
MRII Beijing
MRII Xiamen
MRII Xindian
MRII Hong Kong
MRII Tokyo
PRII Fuzhou
PRII Tianjin
PRII Hangzhou
PRII Nanjing
PRII Hong Kong

AUSTRALIA & NEW ZEALAND
GRII Sydney
GRII Melbourne
GRII Perth
MRII Auckland

EUROPE
MRII Berlin
MRII Hamburg
MRII Munich
MRII Bern
PRII Stockholm

See also
 Stephen Tong
 Messiah Cathedral
Annual Convention Event
NREC (National Reformed Evangelical Convention) https://nrec.stemi.id
NRETC (National Reformed Evangelical Teen Convention) https://nretc.stemi.id
BCN (Bible Camp National) http://bcn.stemi.id

References

External links
 

Calvinist denominations established in the 20th century
Evangelical denominations in Asia
Members of the World Reformed Fellowship
Reformed denominations in Indonesia
Christian organizations established in 1989